"Lord, I Lift Your Name on High" is a worship song. It was written by Rick Founds in 1989.

Founds wrote the song during his morning devotion, while reading the scriptures on his computer monitor and watching television. He plucked his guitar thinking about the "cycle of redemption", comparing it with the water cycle.

Founds performed the song as a worship leader in his church. It was picked up by Maranatha! Music and initially recorded by the Maranatha! Singers followed by the Praise Band. Promise Keepers performed the song in English and Spanish in their drives.

Since the 1990s, it has been one of the most popular Christian songs. In the United States, Christian Copyright Licensing International (CCLI) reported Lord I Lift Your Name on High as the most popular song used in churches every year from 1997 to 2003.  Currently it is No. 24 on the list. CCLI UK report it as the fifth most popular printed, projected or recorded song in mid-2006.  In Australia this song was the seventh most used song by the beginning of 2007

There have been many interpretations of the song by many artists in all styles: gospel, R&B, soul, rock, dance, reggae, hip hop, rap, soca, ska, punk, a cappella amongst others and has been translated to a number of languages and recorded in a number of countries.

Versions
In 1989, the first recorded version was by the Maranatha! Singers on the label Maranatha! Music. The recording was done on the album Double Praise 12 of the Praise series and was released on the Maranatha! Music and distributed by WORD Inc.  The recording was done in classic style. 
In 1992 Paul Baloche performed the song on his Album He Is Faithful, published by Hosanna! Music
In 1997, Christian band Petra on their album Petra Praise 2: We Need Jesus
In 1998, Christian ska-punk band The Insyderz on their album Skalleluia!
In 1999, Christian singer Carman on his album Passion for Praise, Vol. 1
In 2000, American Christian singer Lincoln Brewster on his album Live to Worship
In 2000, American Gospel singer and composer Donnie McClurkin on his album  Live in London and More...
In 2001, Christian Contemporary band SONICFLOOd released a live rock version of the song on their album Sonicpraise. It was recorded in 1999 during the Flevo Festival
In 2004, South African-UK musician and singer Jonathan Butler released a soul cover version on his worship album "The Worship Project." 
In 2005, the Christian pop group Worship Jamz recorded a pop version in their self-titled album Worship Jamz
It has also been covered by Jamaican singer Chevelle Franklyn.
In 2009, Coffey Anderson performed the song on his album Worship Unplugged Vol. 1

Language versions
In 2005, the song was done as "" in Lingala by the Dutch-Congolese band Makoma. It appeared on the Makoma album Na Nzambe Te, Bomoyi Te (also known as No Jesus, No Life). 
The song was also translated into:
Czech – "" (I profess Your name)
Dutch – "" (Lord, I praise Your great name)
Finnish – "" (Lord, I exalt You)
French – "" (I praise your name, Eternal One)
German – "" (Lord, Your name be exalted)
Portuguese – "" (I will exalt your name)
Korean – "" (As I Lift Lord's name)
Malayalam – "" (Let us lift Jesus' name)
Norwegian – "" (God, I exalt your name)
Polish – "" (I want to exalt Thy name)
Slovenian – "" (I elevate your name)
Spanish – "" (I will Lift your name On High)
Swedish – "" (God I lift up your name)
There are also versions in Chinese, Japanese, Hmong, Tamil and Turkish.

References

Christian songs
1989 songs
Promise Keepers